State Highway 182 (SH 182) is a state highway between Alba and Quitman in the U.S. state of Texas.

Route description
SH 182's western terminus is at U.S. Highway 69 in Alba. The highway travels east through Wood County along the southern shoreline of the Lake Fork Reservoir. The highway's eastern terminus is at its intersection with SH 154 west of Quitman. However, signage in Quitman at the intersection of Main Street (SH 37, SH 154, and Loop 173) and Bermuda Street directs motorists to SH 182 via SH 154 (West Bermuda Street).

History
SH 182 was designated on November 30, 1932 along its current route. The route was part of SH 42 before March 19, 1930, but was erroneously omitted from the highway log issued on that date.

Junction list

References

182
Transportation in Wood County, Texas